This is a list of the starting quarterbacks for the Oklahoma Sooners football teams since 1950.

Key

Quarterbacks

References
General

Specific

Lists of college football quarterbacks

Oklahoma Sooners quarterbacks